Fox 10 may refer to one of the following television stations in the United States affiliated with the Fox Broadcasting Company:

Current
KBRR, Grand Forks, North Dakota
Satellite of KVRR in Fargo, North Dakota
KFNE, Riverton, Wyoming
Satellite of KFNB in Casper, Wyoming
KIDY, San Angelo, Texas  (cable channel; broadcasts on channel 6)
KMOT-DT2, a digital channel of KMOT in Minot, North Dakota
KSAZ-TV, Phoenix, Arizona (O&O)
WABG-DT2 Greenwood, Mississippi (cable channel; broadcasts on channel 32)
WALA-TV, Mobile, Alabama
WGEM-DT3, a digital channel of WGEM-TV in Quincy, Illinois
WTHI-DT2, a digital channel of WTHI-TV in Terre Haute, Indiana
WVFX-TV, Clarksburg, West Virginia

Former
KMTF (now KUHM-TV), Helena, Montana (1998–2001)